Song of the Wind may refer to: 

"Song of the Wind", a song by Chick Corea from the album Piano Improvisations Vol. 1, 1971
Song of the Wind, an alternate title for the Joe Farrell album Joe Farrell Quartet, 1970
"Song of the Wind", a song by Santana from Caravanserai (album), 1972

See also
Song of the Wind and the Trees